Door Jam can refer to:

 Doorjamb part of door frame
 A Frasier episode of the same name 
 "Door Jam (2 Stupid Dogs)", an episode of 2 Stupid Dogs